The 2001 FIA GT Budapest 500 km was the sixth round the 2001 FIA GT Championship season.  It took place at the Hungaroring, Hungary, on July 1, 2001.

Official results
Class winners in bold.  Cars failing to complete 70% of winner's distance marked as Not Classified (NC).

Statistics
 Pole position – #3 Team Carsport Holland – 1:38.186
 Fastest lap – #2 Lister Storm Racing – 1:39.068
 Average speed – 134.170 km/h

References

 
 

B
Budapest 500